Lyckeby GoIF was a Swedish football club located in Lyckeby in Karlskrona Municipality, Blekinge County. The club merged with Karlskrona AIF in 2012 to form FK Karlskrona.

Background
Lyckeby GoIF (Gymnastik- och Idrottsförening) was a sports club which was founded on 5 February 1925. There were around 40 young sports enthusiasts who wanted a local club that would involve young people in sports such as tennis, swimming, winter sports, wrestling and football.

Since their foundation Lyckeby GoIF has participated mainly in the middle divisions of the Swedish football league system.  The club played their home matches at the Lyckåvallen in Lyckeby. Since 1995 the clubhouse has been located at Lyckåvallen where there are four football fields, six changing rooms, a cafe and various storage sheds.

Lyckeby GoIF were affiliated to Blekinge Fotbollförbund.

Recent history
In recent seasons Lyckeby GoIF have competed in the following divisions:

2011 – Division III, Sydöstra Götaland
2010 – Division III, Sydöstra Götaland
2009 – Division III, Sydöstra Götaland
2008 – Division IV, Blekinge
2007 – Division IV, Blekinge
2006 – Division IV, Blekinge
2005 – Division IV, Blekinge
2004 – Division IV, Blekinge
2003 – Division IV, Blekinge
2002 – Division IV, Blekinge
2001 – Division IV, Blekinge
2000 – Division IV, Blekinge
1999 – Division IV, Blekinge

Attendances
In recent seasons Lyckeby GoIF have had the following average attendances:

Footnotes

External links
 Lyckeby GoIF – Official website
 Lyckeby GoIF on Facebook

Football clubs in Blekinge County
Association football clubs established in 1925
1925 establishments in Sweden